A litter box, also known as a sandbox, cat box, litter tray, cat pan, potty, pot or litter pan, is an indoor feces and urine collection box for cats, as well as rabbits, ferrets, miniature pigs, small dogs, and other pets that instinctively or through training will make use of such a repository. They are provided for pets that are permitted free roam of a home but who cannot or do not always go outside to excrete their metabolic waste.

In the wild, cats naturally excrete in soft or sandy soil for easy burial. They use their paws in a backward sweeping motion to cover their feces. Litter box filler is a loose, granular material that absorbs moisture and odors such as ammonia. Some litter brands contain baking soda to absorb such odors, or owners may sprinkle a thin layer in the bottom of the box, under the cat litter. The litter material also satisfies a cat's instinctive desire to hide their scent by allowing them to bury their waste. The most common material is clay, although recycled paper "pellets" and silica-based "crystal" variants are also used. Sometimes, when an owner wishes to stimulate the cat's natural instincts, natural dirt is used.

The litter can give off a strong odor, and must be disposed of periodically. It is recommended that the litter box be kept in low traffic areas of the home, such as a basement or laundry room to avoid litter box aversion. There are commercially available special types of litter to help cover or lessen the odor produced. They contain baking soda, plant extracts and/or odorized crystals. If kept in a room with an intake vent, an air freshener may be added on the furnace filter to isolate the odor from the rest of the house.

Types of litter box filler
In the US, cat litter is a $2 billion industry consuming  of mined clay annually.

Non-clumping conventional litter
The first commercially available cat litter in the United States was Kitty Litter, available in 1947 and marketed by Ed Lowe. This was the first large-scale use of clay (in the form of Fuller's earth) in litter boxes; previously sand was used. Clay litter is much more absorbent than sand and is manufactured into large grains or clumps of clay, making it less likely to be tracked from the litter box. The brand name Kitty Litter has become a genericized trademark, used by many to denote any type of cat litter. Today, cat litter can be obtained at a variety of retail stores. Non-clumping cat litter is often made of zeolite, diatomite and sepiolite.

Clumping litter

Litter clumps were first developed by using calcium bentonite clay. This was manufactured in the UK in the 1950s by the Fuller's Earth Union (FEU), which later became a part of Laporte Industries Ltd. Subsequently in America, clumping bentonite was developed in 1984 by biochemist Thomas Nelson. Most are made from granulated bentonite clay, which clumps together when wet and forms a solid mass separate from the other litter in the box. This solid clumped material can be scooped out and disposed of without changing the entire contents of the litter box.

Clumping litter usually also contains quartz or diatomaceous earth (sometimes called diatomaceous silica, which causes it to be mistakenly confused with silica gel litter). Because of the clumping effect, the manufacturers usually instruct not to flush clumping litters down the toilet, because it could clog it.

Clumping clay cat litters are natural products. Some may also contain naturally occurring crystalline silica, or silica dust, which in California is treated as a known carcinogen under Proposition 65. Clay litter is also criticized by the manufacturers of non-clay litter because the components of clay litter are commonly obtained from a strip mine in an environmentally degrading process.

This sort of litter can be toxic to ferrets, leading to both respiratory and digestive problems.

Biodegradable litter
Biodegradable litters are made from various plant resources, including pine wood pellets, recycled newspaper, clumping sawdust, Brazilian cassava, corn, wheat, walnuts, barley, soy pulp and dried orange peel.

Each year, more than two million tons of cat litter, or approximately 100,000 truckloads, ends up in landfills in the U.S. alone. Primarily this is not biodegradable or renewable and adds to the waste burden. Some pet owners prefer biodegradable litters due to its friendliness to the environment. Biodegradable cat litter can also be eliminated completely by safely composting the used litter at home. Other cat owners can be attracted to the biodegradable litters because of their flushability or deodorizing properties. Some pets, such as those with asthma or sensitive senses of smell, may also benefit from the reduced dust in some forms of biodegradable litter.

Biodegradable litter packaged specifically for cats tends to be more expensive than traditional clay litters, so cost is often not a positive factor in their selection. However, one of these, namely pine pellets can be purchased from regional feed stores that normally carry  bags for horse bedding at a significant cost reduction, often cheaper than the cheapest clumping litter. Most biodegradable litters last longer than the equivalent size of clay or clumping clay litters. Grain-based animal or poultry feed also provides an economical alternative to products marketed specifically as cat litter. Additionally, most of these forms of litter are recycled from human usage and are thus reusing a waste product as opposed to drawing clay from mines.

Silica gel litter

Silica gel litter, often referred to as "crystal litter", is a porous granular form of silicon dioxide, has the highest absorbency of any litter, and has excellent moisture control and complete odor elimination for an extended period of time compared to other litters.

Some owners praise its absorbency because  can absorb liquid and odor for up to 30 days for one healthy normal weight cat. It is important to lightly stir the crystals daily while scooping the solid waste, otherwise urine can pool in the box. When crystal litter is saturated, at the end of 30 days or so, it begins to smell and is visibly saturated (the white crystals have turned slightly yellow). In comparison, over the same time period it may take  or more of clay or clumping litter, because it is necessary to replenish the litter that is removed when the clumped urine is scooped out. No replenishing is necessary with silica gel (crystal) litter.

Types

Open litter pans
An open litter pan is generally the most basic and least expensive design. Open litter pans allow for maximum ventilation which may increase cat comfort. However, they do show the waste most visibly and trap no odors which may encourage owners to scoop the box more frequently. Litter pans with low walls are not ideal for containing litter when a pet scratches or digs. Also, some animals who eliminate standing up may be able to urinate or defecate over the walls. Some designs include a detachable rim to help catch litter when the animal kicks to bury their waste.

Enclosed litter boxes

A variety of enclosed litter boxes exist that include both the tray and hood. Many are constructed out of plastic and feature a plastic hood or dome that covers the litter pan and litter. The pet enters through an opening in the cover, these may be open or have a swinging door. To clean, pet owners lift the cover off the tray to scoop and change the litter. Covered litter boxes may help reduce the amount of litter that is tracked outside the box, may help address issues of pets eliminating waste over the walls of a litter pan, and may help reduce odor.

Top-entry litter boxes
Top entry litter boxes have an opening on the top of the box and require the pet to climb on top of the box and into a hole to eliminate waste. While cats in good physical health, even kittens, have no problems accessing these boxes, they are generally not recommended for geriatric or physically limited felines.  However, top-entry designs do have the added benefit of deterring other pets or young children from the contents of the litter box. Some designs feature a grate on top which allows litter from a cat's paws to fall back into the box, reducing litter tracking.

Self-cleaning litter boxes

Self-cleaning litter boxes employ technology that automates the litter box emptying procedure. Some models have electric combing mechanisms that automatically scoop the clumps out of the litter box into a sealed, disposable-bag-lined container after the animal has used it. These models use a pressure pad or an infrared light to determine when the cat has left the box and will comb the box after a pre-determined amount of time has passed to avoid disturbing the cat. Other designs take this one step further by connecting directly to a home's plumbing (faucet connection and drain) so they can wash, rinse and dry the permanent litter pellets automatically.
Simpler designs exist as well; for example, some require the owner to manually shake the clumps into an easy-to-remove tray. Another variant has an enclosed sphere which rotates as it sifts out the clumps and deposits them in a drawer below the sphere. A new method involves incorporating sifting functionality within a sifting litter liner. Some automated litter boxes incorporate the use of a two-belt system. The top belt has litter ready to use while the lower belt has a batch of litter ready "on hold" for when the cleaning process takes place. As the litter on the bottom belt is moved up to the top, is it evenly distributed across the width of the top belt.

Disposable litter boxes
This newer design has increased in popularity with cat owners for their convenience, odor control and travel ability. These litter boxes are disposable and as such do not require going through any of the pain of cleanings or litter refills. Some disposable litter boxes may come with an included bag of litter or owners can choose to fill them with their own. They are also marketed for use inside of pet crates or carriers to eliminate accidents, and may also help control odors if they are thrown away and changed routinely. Once the product has been used to completion, owners can simply dispose of both the litter box and its contents.

Litter box furniture and cabinets 
For cat owners who want to hide their litter pan in plain sight, many are moving towards litter box furniture. Cabinets designed to open and fit litter pans inside. Cats can access through a front, side, or top entrance. These cabinets are constructed of wood or wood composite and offered in different colors and styles, from traditional to contemporary. Features can include storage drawers, odor filters, wall liners, and external litter catches. While prices can vary from moderate to expensive, litter box furniture can help hide unsightly litter pans as well as contain litter odors.

Alternatives 
Instead of using a litter box, it is possible to train cats and dogs to use a toilet. Doing so significantly reduces waste, but for cats it goes against their instinct of burying waste. Combined with the requirement of jumping up onto the toilet, cats may find using a toilet stressful. In addition, excrement-based symptoms of medical problems are less likely to be spotted. There is also a higher likelihood of conflict with human use of toilets.

Another option for animals to relieve themselves indoors is to use an absorbent potty pad, also known as a puppy pad.

The final option is to train your cat or dog to relieve themselves outside. If you have an outside area or yard you can easily train you cat to go outside. This will be their natural instincts but for a dog it can be more challenging.

See also
Animal latrine
Cat intelligence
Gravel
Litter boxes in schools hoax
Sandpit

References

External links

Cats as pets
Dogs as pets
Urine
Pet equipment
Feces
Rabbits as pets

fr:Litière
sv:Kattlåda